Brian Davies may refer to:

Brian Davies (philosopher) (born 1951), professor of philosophy at Fordham University
E. Brian Davies (born 1944), British mathematician
Brian Davies (rugby league) (1930–2012), Australian rugby league player
Brian Davies (activist) (1935–2022), British animal welfare activist
Brian Davies (actor) in A Funny Thing Happened on the Way to the Forum, and The Sound of Music

See also
 Brian Davis (disambiguation)
 Bryan Davies (disambiguation)